The 1988-89 Four Hills Tournament took place at the four traditional venues of Oberstdorf, Garmisch-Partenkirchen, Innsbruck and Bischofshofen, located in Germany and Austria, between 30 December 1988 and 6 January 1989.

Results

Overall

References

External links 
  

Four Hills Tournament
1988 in ski jumping
1989 in ski jumping
1988 in German sport
1989 in German sport
1989 in Austrian sport